Hesselbach can refer to:

People 

 Franz Kaspar Hesselbach (1759-1816), German surgeon and anatomist
 Adam Kaspar Hesselbach (1788-1856), German surgeon and anatomist
 Jürgen Hesselbach, German professor and president of the Technical University of Braunschweig

Places in Germany 

 Hesselbach, Bad Laasphe, in North Rhine-Westphalia